Charles Cantor (September 4, 1898–September 11, 1966) was an American radio and TV actor. Cantor was known for his frequent appearances on radio, sometimes, totaling 40 shows a week, during the 1930s, 1940s and 1950s. Cantor also appeared in nearly 30 television shows between 1951 and 1965.

Cantor's most notable roles on radio were those of Socrates Mulligan on the "Allen's Alley" segments of The Fred Allen Show, Clifton Finnegan on Duffy's Tavern and as Logan Jerkfinkel on The Jack Benny Program. Cantor also was the second of three actors to portray Abie Levy's father Solomon Levy on Abie's Irish Rose.

Cantor was not related to comedian Eddie Cantor (whose real last name was Itzkowitz and only used Cantor as a stage surname). However, his brother was actor Nat Cantor.

Radio
Cantor first stepped onto the radio scene in 1921 as an actor for a local program at WHN in New York City. From there, Cantor's radio career took off. Between the 1930s and the 1950s, Cantor was a feature guest on anywhere between 20 and 40 radio programs a week, most of them comedy shows. Some of his radio guest star appearances included The Shadow, Dick Tracy, The Life of Riley, The Baby Snooks Show and The Kate Smith Hour.

Cantor became popular with radio audiences in 1940 when he joined the cast of The Fred Allen Show. Cantor, along with Alan Reed and John Brown, joined the cast of the new Texaco Star Theater. When "Allen's Alley", a segment in which star Fred Allen would stroll through an imaginary neighborhood conversing with imaginary neighbors, was first introduced in 1942, Cantor soon joined the list of Allen's "neighbors". Cantor portrayed the dim-witted Socrates Mulligan on the Alley. Mulligan's other "neighbors" included Mrs. Pansy Nussbaum (Minerva Pious), pompous poets Falstaff Openshaw (Alan Reed), Humphrey Titter and Thorndyle Swinburne, Titus Moody (Parker Fennelly), Ajax Cassidy (Peter Donald), and boisterous southern senator Beuregard Claghorn (announcer Kenny Delmar). Cantor remained with the program until its end in 1949.

Shortly after the premiere of Texaco Star Theater, Cantor joined the cast of Duffy's Tavern. Duffy's Tavern premiered in 1941 with Ed Gardner in the title role of Archie, the head bartender and his then wife Shirley Booth as Miss. Duffy. Cantor was Clifton Finnegan on the program. Finnegan was one of Duffy's main patrons and most frequently heard customers.

The next year, Cantor joined the cast of Abie's Irish Rose, replacing Alfred White in the role of Solomon Levy. Sol Levy was a widower who owned his own business in the Bronx and is Abie Levy's father. The program itself depicted the story of a Jewish man who marries an Irish woman despite family objections. Cantor was soon replaced by his "Allen's Alley" co-star Alan Reed. The program ended in 1944.

Television
Cantor made his television debut on the February 25, 1951 episode of The Colgate Comedy Hour. Lena Horne, Jack Albertson and Chris Barbery also made appearances on the episode. Eddie Cantor was the host of the episode. Cantor also had a recurring role as Logan Jerkfinkel on both the radio and television incarnations of The Jack Benny Program. He appeared on 16 episodes of the television version of the program between 1954 and 1965.

Throughout the 1950s and 1960s, Cantor guest starred in 30 television shows. Along the list of Cantor's television credits included The Ray Bolger Show, Damon Runyon Theater, Alfred Hitchcock Presents, Schlitz Playhouse of Stars, Playhouse 90, December Bride, Bachelor Father, The Ann Sothern Show, The Red Skelton Show, The Danny Thomas Show, The Dick Van Dyke Show, Bob Hope Presents the Chrysler Theatre and The Lucy Show. His last appearance was on a 1965 episode of O.K. Crackerby!.

Death
Cantor died in Hollywood on September 11, 1966, a week after his 68th birthday. He was survived by his wife Reece Cantor, who herself died on May 16, 1968, at the age of 66. The couple are buried together at Mount Sinai Memorial Park in Los Angeles, California.

Filmography

References

External links

1898 births
1966 deaths
Burials at Mount Sinai Memorial Park Cemetery